{{DISPLAYTITLE:C25H42N7O18P3S}}
The molecular formula C25H42N7O18P3S (molar mass: 853.623 g/mol) may refer to:

 Beta-Hydroxybutyryl-CoA
 3-Hydroxyisobutyryl-CoA